Humayun Muhammad Khan is a Pakistani politician who had been a Member of the Provincial Assembly of Sindh, from May 2013 to May 2018.

Early life and education
He was born on 12 April 1965 in Karachi.

Political career

He was elected to the Provincial Assembly of Sindh as a candidate of Pakistan Muslim League (N) from Constituency PS-89 KARACHI-I in 2013 Pakistani general election.

References

Living people
Sindh MPAs 2013–2018
1965 births
Pakistan Muslim League (N) politicians